The following is a list of episodes for the Japanese anime series Ergo Proxy. Ergo Proxy was produced by Manglobe, Inc. and directed by Shūkō Murase, with Dai Satō being chief writer, Naoyuki Onda in charge of character designs and Yoshihiro Ike composing the music. It began broadcasting in Japan on February 25, 2006, on WOWOW. The anime was formerly licensed by Geneon Entertainment in North America, and as of now the license has been rescued by Funimation. Ergo Proxy was at first only released on DVD in North America, until the series was syndicated on Fuse starting on June 9, 2007, at 12:30 a.m. in the United States. The series' opening theme song is "Kiri" by rock group Monoral, and is first shown in episode 3. The ending theme song is "Paranoid Android" by English alternative rock band Radiohead, originally released in 1997. Because of licensing issues surrounding the song's use, the show's Hulu release uses a different ending theme.

List of episodes

DVD

References
 Ergo Proxy WOWOW - WOWOW's official episode listing of Ergo Proxy.

Ergo Proxy